The 2016 American Athletic Conference men's soccer season was the 4th season of men's varsity soccer in the conference.

The SMU Mustangs are the defending regular season champions, and the Tulsa Golden Hurricane are the defending tournament champions.

Changes from 2015 

 None

Teams

Stadia and locations 

 East Carolina, Houston and Tulane do not sponsor men's soccer

Regular season

Results

Rankings

Postseason

AAC tournament

Note: * denotes overtime period(s).

NCAA tournament

All-AAC awards and teams

See also 
 2016 NCAA Division I men's soccer season
 2016 American Athletic Conference Men's Soccer Tournament
 2016 American Athletic Conference women's soccer season

References 

 
2016 NCAA Division I men's soccer season